MV Stolt Commitment is a chemical tanker owned by Stolt Tankers that collided with, and subsequently sank the general cargo ship Thorco Cloud in the Singapore Strait in December 2015. The collision resulted in six casualties from a total crew of 12 on the Thorco Cloud, and minor structural damage to the Stolt Commitment.

Construction
The ship was constructed by Kværner Florø AS, Norway. The keel was laid in January 1999 and the ship was launched in January 2000 as the MV Bow Century.

History
The ship has undergone name and Flag State changes throughout its service life, including:
MV Stolt Commitment flagged in the Cayman Islands.
 MV Bow Century flagged in Norway.

Collision with the Thorco Cloud

On 16 December 2015 the ship was transiting the Singapore Strait en route to Kaohsiung from Rotterdam. During Thorco Cloud'''s transit into the Singapore Strait traffic separation scheme after departing the Indonesian port of Batu Ampar, the two ships collided, causing the Thorco Cloud to be split into two parts and causing them both to sink within the strait. The Stolt Commitment'' only suffered minor structural damage.

References

Maritime incidents in 2015
2000 ships